Páez Municipality may refer to the following places in Venezuela:

Páez Municipality, Apure, in Apure
Páez Municipality, Miranda, in Miranda
Páez Municipality, Portuguesa, in Portuguesa
Páez Municipality, Zulia, in Zulia

Municipality name disambiguation pages